Sophie Nyweide (born July 8, 2000) is an American child actress best known for her roles in Bella, Mammoth and An Invisible Sign.

Career
Nyweide's major motion picture debut was as the eponymous lead character in Alejandro Gomez Monteverde's drama production of Bella in 2006. Soon after she appeared in And Then Came Love, Margot at the Wedding, and New York City Serenade in 2007. Nyweide also had a guest appearance in Law & Order as Agatha Archer in the episode "Charity Case". She was seen in Mammoth in 2009 as Jackie Vidales, the screen daughter of Michelle Williams and Gael García Bernal. In 2011 she starred alongside  Jessica Alba and Chris Messina in the film An Invisible Sign as Lisa Venus, and in the film Mistakes Were Made as Otelia. Her last screen credit was for the 2015 short film Born Again.

Filmography

References

External links
 

2000 births
American child actresses
American film actresses
Living people
American television actresses
21st-century American women